Gillespie Archibald Campbell, 2nd Earl of Argyll ( – 9 September 1513) was a Scottish nobleman and politician who was killed at the Battle of Flodden.

Biography
Archibald was the eldest son of Colin Campbell, 1st Earl of Argyll and Isabel Stewart, daughter of John Stewart, 2nd Lord Lorne.

He was made Master of the Royal Household of James IV of Scotland on 24 March 1495. After a crisis of law and order in the west of Scotland, Argyll was made governor of Tarbert Castle and Baillie of Knapdale, and this was followed by an appointment as Royal Lieutenant in the former Lordship of the Isles on 22 April 1500. Argyll eventually rose to the position of Lord High Chancellor of Scotland. His "clan" was rivalled only by Clan Gordon.

The Earls of Argyll were hereditary Sheriffs of Lorne and Argyll. However, a draft record of the 1504 Parliament of Scotland records a move to request Argyll to hold his Sherriff Court at Perth, where the King and his council could more easily oversee proceedings, if the Earl was found at fault. The historian Norman Macdougall suggests this clause may have been provoked by Argyll's kinship with Torquil MacLeod and MacLean of Duart. These western chiefs supported the suppressed Lordship of the Isles.

The Earl of Argyll was killed at the Battle of Flodden on 9 September 1513, with the king and many others. He is buried at Kilmun Parish Church.

Family
By his wife Elizabeth, a daughter of John Stewart, 1st Earl of Lennox, Argyll had issue:
 Colin Campbell
 Archibald Campbell of Skipness (d 1537 escaping from Edinburgh Castle), second husband of Janet Douglas, Lady Glamis
 Sir John Campbell of Calder (d.1546) ancestor of the Earls Cawdor
 Donald Campbell the Abbot of Coupar Angus
 Margaret Campbell, who married John Erskine, 5th Lord Erskine
 Isabel Campbell, married Gilbert Kennedy, 2nd Earl of Cassilis
 Janet Campbell, married John Stewart, 2nd Earl of Atholl
 Jean Campbell, married Sir John Lamont of that ilk, son Duncan Lamont
 Catherine Campbell, married Lachlan Cattanach Maclean, 11th Chief of Duart, secondly to Archibald Campbell of Auchinbreck
 Marion Campbell, married Sir Robert Menzies of that ilk
 Elen Campbell, married Sir Gavin Kennedy of Blairquhan
 Mary Campbell, married James Stewart, 4th Earl of Bute

References

Lord chancellors of Scotland
2
Deaths at the Battle of Flodden
15th-century births
1513 deaths
Court of James IV of Scotland
Scottish landowners
Burials at the Argyll Mausoleum
15th-century Scottish peers
16th-century Scottish peers